Gosfield School is an English co-educational independent school in Gosfield, in the Braintree district of Essex. It was founded in 1929.

Setting
The school is housed in a mid-nineteenth century building sited in 110 acres of parkland. The school also features an onsite, fully accredited forest school, and modern sport centre.

Houses 
The school has three houses: Nevil, Tudor and Woodstock.

References

Private schools in Essex
Educational institutions established in 1929
1929 establishments in England